The Browns Plains bus station, at Browns Plains, is serviced by TransLink bus routes. It is part of the Grand Plaza Shopping Centre and is a major interchange for TransLink's Southern Region. It is in a transition precinct between Zone 2 and Zone 3 of the TransLink integrated public transport system.  The station has three platforms.

In 2014, the bus station underwent a two-stage upgrade.

References

Bus stations in Brisbane
Buildings and structures in Logan City